Anie may refer to:

 Pic d'Anie, a mountain peak in the Pyrenees of France
 Anié, a town in Togo
 The Anglican Network in Europe (ANiE)